Prothecini is a tribe of death-watch and spider beetles in the family Ptinidae. There are about 15 genera in Prothecini.

Genera
These 15 genera belong to the tribe Prothecini:

 Anakania Pic, 1901 g
 Anisotheca Español, 1970
 Ascutotheca Lesne, 1911
 Chondrotheca Lesne, 1911
 Falsostagetus Viñolas et Masó, 2008
 Metatheca Scott, 1924
 Methemus Broun, 1882
 Nesotheca Scott, 1924
 Peritheca Logvinovskiy, 1978
 Protheca LeConte, 1865 i c g b
 Sculptotheca Schilsky, 1900 i c g b
 Stagetodes Español, 1970 g
 Stagetus Wollaston, 1861 i c g b
 Stichtoptychus Fall, 1905 i c g b
 Striatheca White, 1973 i c g b

Data sources: i = ITIS, c = Catalogue of Life, g = GBIF, b = Bugguide.net

References

Further reading

External links

 

Ptinidae